Rockville is a residential locality in the Toowoomba Region, Queensland, Australia.

Geography 

The eastern edge of the suburb is home to an industrial area. Rockville State School (1922), Leslie Research Centre and St Andrew's Private Hospital are other features within its boundaries.

History 
Rockville State School opened on  1 November 1922.

The suburb was officially named in 1981.

The suburb had a SEIFA score of 908, placing it below all other suburbs in the district except Harlaxton.

Education 
Rockville State School is a government primary (Prep-6) school for boys and girls at 3 Holberton Street. In 2017, the school had an enrolment of 175 students with 16 teachers (13 full-time equivalent) and 14 non-teaching staff (10 full-time equivalent). It includes a special education program.

References

Further reading

External links 
 

Suburbs of Toowoomba
Localities in Queensland